Demir-Kapu is the second highest mountain in Crimea. Its height stands 1540 meters above sea level.

References 

 Географічна енциклопедія України: в 3-х томах / Редколегія: О. М. Маринич (відпов. ред.) та ін. — К.: «Українська радянська енциклопедія» імені М. П. Бажана, 1989.

Crimean Mountains
One-thousanders of Ukraine